The Oscar Roeser House is a historic house in Grand Island, Nebraska. It was built by Henry Falldorf in 1908 for Oscar Roeser, a businessman from Michigan who lived here with his wife, née Minnie Stolley, and their son, Oscar. Roeser was of German descent, and he joined the Liederkranz in Grand Island. His house was designed in the Classical Revival style by Thomas Rogers Kimball. It has been listed on the National Register of Historic Places since June 25, 1982.

References

National Register of Historic Places in Hall County, Nebraska
Neoclassical architecture in Nebraska
Houses completed in 1908
1908 establishments in Nebraska